Kornalovychi (or Kornałowice) is a village (selo) in Sambir Raion, Lviv Oblast, in south-west Ukraine. It belongs to Novyi Kalyniv urban hromada, one of the hromadas of Ukraine. 

The local Catholic parish was first mentioned in 1375. An Orthodox church was mentioned already in 1507. In the interwar period the village belonged to Poland and had around 2,000 inhabitants, over half of them were Poles.

References 

Kornalovychi